Unibuddy is an EdTech company that provides a student engagement platform for higher education institutions. The platform allows prospective and current students to connect with student ambassadors and alumni from the same or similar courses, providing a peer-to-peer support network enabling prospective students to learn about life at a particular university, including course information, accommodation, and student life. Unibuddy was founded in 2015 by Kimeshan Naidoo and Diego Fanara and is headquartered in London, United Kingdom.

Products 

Unibuddy's main product is Chat, a student engagement platform that enables higher education institutions to connect prospective and current students with student ambassadors and alumni. The platform includes features such as one-to-one messaging, group chat, and video calling, as well as a range of tools for student ambassadors to manage their interactions with prospective students. In 2022, Unibuddy focussed on its newest Community product to help higher education institutions create belonging and to help students connect with each other over common interests.

Partnerships 

Unibuddy has partnerships with over 600 higher education institutions around the world, including the University of Cambridge, NYU, Imperial College London and Arizona State University. In addition, Unibuddy has a partnership with UCAS (University and Colleges Admissions Service), the organisation responsible for managing applications to higher education institutions in the UK. Through this partnership, Unibuddy provides its platform to UCAS to help prospective students connect with current university students and alumni as they make their decisions on where to apply to university. This partnership allows UCAS to offer a more personalised and comprehensive service to its users, helping them make informed decisions about their education. Unibuddy has similar partnerships with StudyPortal and IDP.

Funding 

Unibuddy has raised a total of $32 million in funding from investors including Stride VC, Highland VC and Daniel Borel. In 2019, the company raised a $5 million Series A funding round, and additional $5 million Series A round in Q1 2021 which was finally followed by a $20 million Series B funding round later in 2021.

Impact 
Unibuddy has had a significant impact on the world of education and higher learning. The company's platform allows prospective students to connect with current university students and alumni, this has helped to bridge the gap between prospective and current students, and has made the university application process more transparent and accessible for students around the world. Additionally, Unibuddy's products have helped universities to engage with prospective students in a more personalised and effective way, leading to improved recruitment and retention rates.

Unibuddy has helped over 1.5 million prospective students around the world make better high education decisions to date and future growth goals include partnering with over 1500 higher education institutions and to empower 10 million students to progress on their higher education journey by 2025.

References 

Software
Geosocial networking